The year 639 BC was a year of the pre-Julian Roman calendar. In the Roman Empire, it was known as year 115 Ab urbe condita . The denomination 639 BC for this year has been used since the early medieval period, when the Anno Domini calendar era became the prevalent method in Europe for naming years.

Events

Births

Deaths

References